The M1 motorway is a motorway in Ireland. It forms the large majority of the N1 national primary road connecting Dublin towards Belfast along the east of the island of Ireland. The route heads north via Swords, Drogheda and Dundalk to the Northern Irish border just south of Newry in County Armagh, where it joins the A1 road and further on, the M1 motorway in Northern Ireland. It also forms a significant part of the road connection between Dublin and the Northern Irish cities of Newry, and Lisburn.
The route is part of European route E01.

Route

Almost the entire length of the N1 has been upgraded to motorway standard and is designated the M1 motorway. It runs from the Junction 3 of the M50 ring road in Dublin, past Cloghran, Swords, Balbriggan, Drogheda and Dundalk before ending at Ballymascanlon north of Dundalk. It by-passes many towns through which the N1 travelled. The original N1 route now forms the R132. At Ballymascanlon, it becomes the N1 dual carriageway and continues to the border with Northern Ireland. The motorway section of the N1 uses the M1 designation. Small yellow route markers along the motorway route also read N1.

The motorway was built in several stages as short disconnected bypasses, replacing the original N1 route. The first section opened (in 1983) was from Whitehall to Coolock Lane followed (in 1985) by the Airport Motorway between Whitehall and Dublin Airport, only the third section of motorway opened in the Republic. 1980s style direction signs were still intact on this route up until 2006. Part of this original M1 is now a spur to Dublin Airport, while another part between Whitehall to the Port Tunnel portals is now narrowed to two+one lanes (although still grade-separated) as a result of the Dublin Port Tunnel work.

There are toll fees for use of the motorway between junctions 7 and 10, the section which forms the Drogheda bypass.  Work began in 2004 on a bypass of Dundalk, and was completed three months ahead of schedule in 2005, extending the motorway to just south of the border.

Construction finished in 2007 on a cross-border stretch of grade-separated dual-carriageway linking the northern end of the M1 with the A1 near Newry in County Armagh. This was opened to traffic on 2 August 2007. This allows traffic to flow freely from Dublin Port on motorway/dual-carriageway standard road to the Hillsborough Roundabout, located south of Lisburn.

A  speed limit applies on most of the M1, the exception being a  limit between Junction 1 and Junction 2 at Dublin Airport. The lower speed limit is credited to the much higher volumes of traffic on this stretch.

Junctions

This is Transport Infrastructure Ireland's Exit numbering scheme for the M1.  all junctions feature their number on road signs.

All-Ireland route

The upgrade of the N1 is now complete in the Republic of Ireland, the first major route to be completely upgraded to motorway/dual carriageway standard (outside of Dublin city centre) as per the National Development Plan. The Northern Irish authorities have no plans to replace the A1 route (currently dual carriageway) with a motorway, although many junctions have now been grade separated. Currently, to drive from Dublin city centre to Belfast, one travels along the M1 (Republic of Ireland), N1, A1 and M1 (Northern Ireland).

Motorway service areas
The first official on-line Motorway service area in Ireland opened on the M1 on 8 September 2010, located near Lusk. A second near Castlebellingham (M1 North service area) opened on 29 September 2010. Each location has northbound and southbound facilities, with no connection across the motorway between each side. Open 24 hours a day, they provide fuel and food and are of a design similar to those found in other European countries. The service areas are run by a consortium of companies known as Superstop.

ITS on the M1
As with other sections of Irish motorways which feature Variable-message signs, the M1 is also connected to an Intelligent transportation system providing real-time journey time information for motorists. The system works by recognising vehicle number plates at intervals along the motorway, and uses this information to calculate average vehicle speeds and hence travel times. Northbound, VMSs near Malahide and Balbriggan provide information on the journey times to the Drogheda (J7) and Dundalk (J16) exits. Similar signs southbound provide information on the travel time to Dublin Airport and the Dublin Port Tunnel.

Roadside art on the M1
Roadside art is funded under the Percentage For Arts Scheme where 1% of the scheme budget is allocated to roadside art with a cap of €63,000. The local authorities decide on a theme and are responsible for commissioning the work, usually by open competition. There are several examples along the M1
 The Beehives. Three corbelled beehives on the Balbriggan bypass by artists Robert McColgan and Irene Benner made of cut stone in 2001 – Inspired by the tale of St. Molach, a beekeeper.
 An Tarbh Donn, a three-metre-high bull on the Dundalk bypass by artist Micheál McKeown. Of metal mesh on a concrete base.  Inspired by the Bull in the Táin Bó Cúailnge.

See also

Roads in Ireland
Motorways in Ireland
National secondary road
Regional road
List of toll roads in the Republic of Ireland

References

M01
Roads in Fingal
Roads in County Louth
Roads in County Meath
Roads in Swords, Dublin
Road infrastructure in the Republic of Ireland